TeXML [tɛχːml] is – as a process – a TeX-based alternative to XSL-FO.

TeXML has been developed as an open-source project with the aim to automatically present XML data as PDF with sophisticated layout properties.

By means of an auxiliary structure definition, TeXML overcomes the syntax-based differences between TeX and XML.

Technically, the markup elements of TeX are described by using the XML syntax.

History 

TeXML is a further development of a specification originally defined by Douglas Lovell at IBM, where Structure and Transformation have to be distinguished.

 Structure

The XML definition of the TeXML structure can be considered as being completed since 1999 (TeXML.dtd).

It represents the markup link between TeX and XML.

 Transformation

The transformation processes run smoothly since the end of 2010, a productive application of the technology is possible.

The original approach of using a Java application was published by IBM at IBM alphaWorks, but is no longer present.  It was presented in a paper
at the 1999 annual meeting of the TeX Users Group.

Application 

TeXML is used to generate Technical Documentation from XML data.

After the transformation TeXML → TeX, the entire LaTeX-defined range of TeX macros is available.

By means of using TeX macros, it is possible to publish XML data having configurable layout options.

Specials 

 TeXML allows automatic publication of XML data by means of a typesetting engine, which was originally designed for manual typesetting.
 In contrast to publication using the XSL-FO technique layout properties of XML data can be manipulated by using exception rules in the intermediate code.
 Exception rules are learned by the publication process, the layout properties are thus enhanced with each generation cycle.
 High-speed publishing processes, an increase in speed of up to 100 times compared to XSL-FO based processes, especially in the case of large documents.

TeXML structure 

The Document Type Definition (DTD) of the TeXML structure consists of the XML elements:

 Root element: TeXML
 Encoding commands: cmd
 Encoding environments: env
 Encoding groups: group
 Encoding math groups: math and dmath
 Encoding control symbols: ctrl
 Encoding special symbols: spec
 PDF literals: pdf

Composition of a TeXML document 

An example of an XML document, which has already been transformed into the TeXML structure:

<TeXML>
<TeXML escape="0">
\documentclass[a4paper]{article}
\usepackage[latin1]{inputenc}
\usepackage[T1]{fontenc}
</TeXML>
<env name="document">
Misinterpretation of special characters as being functional characters is called "Escaping", thus: $, ^, >
</env>
</TeXML>

TeXML process 

The TeXML process transforms XML data which are described in the auxiliary intermediate TeXML structure to TeX:

\documentclass[a4paper]{article}
\usepackage[latin1]{inputenc}
\usepackage[T1]{fontenc}
\begin{document}
Misinterpretation of special characters as being functional characters is called "Escaping", thus: \textdollar{}, \^{},
\textgreater{}
\end{document}

Supporting processes 

Works on the "Data Collection Level" (XML) and on the "Publication Level" (TeX) are supported by different tools, for example:

 Data Collection Level: XML editors
– Eclipse (IDE), open source
– other free XML editors

 Publication Level: synchronization between code and generated PDF by means of pdfSync:

– Windows PC: editor MiKTeX
– Mac OS X: editor TeXShop

Literature 

 Frank Mittelbach The LaTeX Companion – Tools and techniques for computer typesetting
 Michel Goossens The XeTeX Companion – TeX meets OpenType and Unicode

External links 
 SGML/XML and (La)TeX – Approaches to transform XML to TeX
 TeXML: an XML syntax for TeX – TeXML project (Download)
 How to embed pdfsync into pdftex – Synchronization between Code and PDF
 TeXML: Typesetting XML with TEX – Original concept of the TeXML project
 Resurrecting TEX in the XML world - 2007 TUGboat article by Oleg Parashchenko re-motivates TeXML
 Generate TEX documents using pdfscript - 2010 TUGboat article by Oleg Parashchenko describes Python implementation

TeXML